The VS-30 is a Brazilian sounding rocket, derived from the Sonda 3 sounding rocket's first stage. It consists of a single, solid-fuelled stage, and has been launched from Alcântara, Maranhão, and Parnamirim, Rio Grande do Norte, in Brazil, and Andøya in Norway.

It has been launched both on its own, or in the VS-30/Orion configuration, with an American Orion upper stage. On its own, it can reach an apogee of 140 kilometres, and with an Orion upper stage, it can reach an apogee of 434 kilometres. The VS-30 is also used as the upper stage of the VSB-30 rocket.

Flights

VS-30
 VS-30 XV-01 -"DLR AL-VS30-223 test" - 1997 April 28 - Apogee: 128 km
 VS-30 XV-02 -"DLR AL-VS30-226" Aeronomy mission - 1997 October 12 - Apogee: 120 km
 VS-30 XV-03 -"DLR AL-VS30-229" Aeronomy mission - 1998 January 31 - Apogee: 120 km
 VS-30 XV-04 -"Operação São Marcos" Microgravity mission - 1999 March 15 - Apogee: 128 km  
 VS-30 XV-05 -"Lençois Maranhenses" Microgravity mission - 2000 February 6 - Apogee: 148 km
 VS-30 XV-06 -"Cuma Microgravity mission" - 2002 December 1 - Apogee: 145 km
 VS-30 V07 -"Angicos GPS technology mission" - 2007 December 16 - Apogee: 120 km
 VS-30 V08 -"Operação Brasil-Alemanha" - 2011 December 2 - 
 VS-30 V09 - WADIS 1 - 28.06.2013
 VS-30 V10 - MAPHEUS 4 - 5.07.2013
 VS-30 V13 - EPL-MEL5 ("Estágio Propulsivo a Propelente Líquido") - "Operação Raposa"- 2014 September 1  -  L5 liquid rocket engine test for 90s, total flight time 3m34s - 2014 September 1
 VS-30 V11 - WADIS 2 - 2015 March 5 
 VS-30 V12 - SPIDER / LEEWAVES - 2016 February 2 
 VS-30 V124 - "Operação MUTITI" - 2018 September 12 - Apogee: 120 km

VS-30 Orion
VS-30 Orion - XV-01 - 21.08.2000  - "Baronesa"
VS-30 Orion - XV-02 - 23.11.2002  - "Piraperna"
VS-30 Orion - V03 - 27.10.2005  - SHEFEX 1 (DLR)
VS-30 Orion - V04 - 31.01.2008  - ARR HotPay-2
VS-30 Orion - V05 - 05.12.2008  - ICI 2
VS-30 Orion - V08 - 03.12.2011  - ICI 3
VS-30 Orion - V06 - 23.04.2012  - HIFiRE 5
VS-30 Orion - V07 - 13.09.2012  - HIFiRE 3
VS-30 Orion - V10 - 08.12.2012  - "Iguaiba"
VS-30 Orion - V09 - 18.09.2013  - [ScramSpace] 1 (launch failure)
VS-30 Orion - V11 - 19.02.2015  - ICI 4
VS-30 Orion -     - 18.05.2016  - HIFiRE 5b

Characteristics

Length (mm) 7428
Payload Mass (kg) 260
Diameter (mm) 557
Total takeoff mass (kg) 1460
Apogee (km) 160

See also

VSB-30
VS-40

References 

Sounding rockets of Brazil
Space program of Brazil
Space programme of Argentina